In mathematics,  the Robin boundary condition (properly ), or third type boundary condition, is a type of boundary condition, named  after Victor Gustave Robin (1855–1897). When imposed on an ordinary or a  partial differential equation, it is a specification of a linear combination of the  values of a function and the values of its derivative on the boundary of the domain. Other equivalent names in use are Fourier-type condition and radiation condition.

Definition
Robin boundary conditions are a weighted combination of Dirichlet boundary conditions and Neumann boundary conditions.  This contrasts to mixed boundary conditions, which are boundary conditions of  different types specified on different subsets of the boundary. Robin boundary conditions are also called impedance boundary conditions, from their application in electromagnetic problems, or convective boundary conditions, from their application in heat transfer problems (Hahn, 2012).

If Ω is the domain on which the given equation is to be solved and ∂Ω denotes its boundary, the Robin boundary condition is:

for some non-zero constants  a and b and a given function g defined on ∂Ω. Here, u is the unknown solution defined on Ω and  denotes the normal derivative at the boundary. More generally, a and b are allowed to be (given) functions, rather than constants.

In one dimension, if, for example, Ω = [0,1], the Robin boundary condition becomes the conditions:

Notice the change of sign in front of the term involving a derivative: that is because the normal to [0,1] at 0 points in the negative direction, while at 1 it points in the positive direction.

Application
Robin boundary conditions are commonly used in solving Sturm–Liouville problems which appear in many contexts in science and engineering.

In addition, the Robin boundary condition is a general form of the insulating boundary condition for convection–diffusion equations.  Here, the convective and diffusive fluxes at the boundary sum to zero:

where D is the diffusive constant, u is the convective velocity at the boundary and c is the concentration. The second term is a result of Fick's law of diffusion.

References

Bibliography
Gustafson, K. and T. Abe, (1998a). The third boundary condition – was it Robin's?, The Mathematical Intelligencer, 20, #1, 63–71.
Gustafson, K. and T. Abe, (1998b). (Victor) Gustave Robin: 1855–1897, The Mathematical Intelligencer, 20, #2, 47–53.

Boundary conditions